John Hamilton (November 25, 1754August 22, 1837) was a member of the United States House of Representatives from Pennsylvania.

Biography
John Hamilton was born in York County (in the part that is now Adams County) in the Province of Pennsylvania.  He moved to Washington County, Pennsylvania, in 1783.  He was commissioned lieutenant colonel of militia in 1786 and brigadier general in 1800.  He was major general of the Fourteenth Division of Militia of Washington and Greene Counties in 1807.  He was appointed high sheriff of Washington County by Governor Thomas Mifflin in 1793 and served until November 1, 1796.  He was a member of the Pennsylvania State Senate from 1796 to 1805 and an associate judge of Washington County from 1802 to 1805.  He was a member of the first board of trustees of Jefferson college (now Washington & Jefferson College) in Washington, Pennsylvania, serving from 1802 to 1831.

Hamilton was elected as a Republican to the Ninth Congress.  He was again appointed associate judge of Washington County on May 31, 1820, and served until his death at his home near Ginger Hill, Pennsylvania.  Interment in Mingo Cemetery, near Monongahela, Pennsylvania.

References

1754 births
1837 deaths
Pennsylvania state senators
Pennsylvania state court judges
Washington & Jefferson College trustees
Pennsylvania militiamen in the American Revolution
Democratic-Republican Party members of the United States House of Representatives from Pennsylvania